Purani Jeans is a 2014 Indian Hindi-language coming-of-age drama film directed by Tanushri Chattrji Bassu. The film stars Tanuj Virwani and Izabelle Leite. It tells the story of young boy who returns to his hometown and reconnects with his old friends. The soundtrack was composed by Ram Sampath. The first look of the film was revealed on 8 March 2014, ahead of film's release on 2 May 2014.

Plot
As an adult, Sid's mother dies. He collects his lost bag at an airport where a girl from a publication house tells him that she read his diary and he is quite a writer which revives some old memories for him. He then goes to India to sell his mother's cottage in Kasauli. Sid finds himself looking back at a past that haunted him for years.

In a flashback, all 4 self-proclaimed cowboys execute the plans to welcome their hero Sam (Aditya Seal). They then go to the station to welcome him, where Sid (Tanuj Virwani) run into Nayantara (Izabelle Leite). Then feeling sorry for themselves they begin to make their way home when they are struck by a black car. After chasing the car it is revealed that it is Sam. He apologises to Zizo and promises to fix his father's car.

They begin their fun by partying, throwing eggs at everyone's house. Sam's relationship with Sid's mom is very strong. Sam's father left him when he was six and in shock of it, his mother became an alcoholic and remarried.

After a few days, Sid runs into Nayantara in a music store; he begins to fall for her. Sam meets and falls for Nayantara in a club with her sister. Also Bobby is shown dancing with her sister.

The flashbacks eventually lead to revealing that Sam committed suicide for which Sid thinks of himself as the cause. Sam's death was due to his troubled past and his relationship with his mother, not because of his best friend Sid. Upon finding this out, Sid and Nayantara reunite.

There is a reunion between the remaining cowboys as they remember the past and the cherished moments they spent with each other and with their friend Sam, because if Sam were alive, that is exactly what he would've done as some friendships last forever.

Cast
Aditya Seal as Samuel Joseph Lawrence “Sam”
Tanuj Virwani as Siddharth “Sid” Ray aka Siddhu
Izabelle Leite as Nayantara Sapru
Param Baidwaan as Bal Singh Shekawat "Bobby"
Raghav Raj Kakker as Susheel Sharma "Suzy"
Kashyap kapoor as Tejinder Singh Kathuria "Tino"
Sarika as Sherry Lawrence (Sam's Mother)
Rati Agnihotri as Monica Ray, Siddarth's Mother
Sammy Durrani as Tanya Sachdev
Swati Pansare as Susheel's Mother
Manoj Pahwa
Rajit Kapur as Abhijeet, Sam's step-father
Kamini Kaushal
Kashika Chopra as Ayesha

Production

The teaser of Purani Jeans was released on 17 March 2014, while the theatrical trailer was released on 19 March 2014. The song Dil aaj kal was shot in Panchgani hostel named Fidai Academy on 27 October 2013.

Soundtrack

Purani Jeans music is composed by Ram Sampath.

References

External links

 
 

2010s buddy comedy-drama films
Indian buddy comedy-drama films
2014 films
2010s Hindi-language films
Indian coming-of-age comedy-drama films
2010s coming-of-age comedy-drama films